Bossert may refer to:

People
 André Bossert (born 1963), Swiss professional golfer
 Gregory Norman Bossert (born 1962), American writer and filmmaker
 Helmuth Theodor Bossert (1889–1961), German art historian, philologist and archaeologist
 Joseph Bossert (1851–1906), French astronomer
 Laura Anne Bossert (born 1968), American violinist, violist and pedagogue
 Otto Richard Bossert (1874–1919), German portrait painter
 Tom Bossert, American lawyer and government official
 W. Max Bossert (1906–1990), American football coach and politician
 Walter F. Bossert (1885-1946), Grand Dragon of the Ku Klux Klan for Indiana, USA
 Walter Bossert (born 1962), German economist

Places
 Bossert Estates, New Jersey,  unincorporated community located within Bordentown Township in Burlington County, New Jersey, United States
 Hotel Bossert, a hotel in Brooklyn, New York City, USA